The Silesian Mountain Railway is a railway line in south-west Poland. It leads from  Görlitz/Zgorzelec on the Lusatian Neisse via Jelenia Góra to Wałbrzych in Lower Silesia.

The first plans for connection of Görlitz with Waldenburg (Wałbrzych) via Hirschberg (Jelenia Góra) and further to Glatz (Kłodzko) appeared in 1853. The Kingdom of Prussia intended to build a direct railway link from Berlin to Vienna, bypassing the Kingdom of Saxony. However, the Austrian Empire did not favor a construction major railway line running parallel to its border.

 As the industrialization of Germany progressed, the original plan was reconsidered several years later. On 24 September 1862, the Prussian parliament approved the construction of a railway line from Görlitz to Waldenburg with a branch line to Kohlfurt (Węgliniec). The line was built stepwise; the last section was opened on 16 August 1867. The first section was electrified by 1915. Due to the First World War, the electrification was not finished until 1 September 1923.

The railway was one of the first German electrified lines. Before the Second World War, it was used to transport vast amounts of Silesian hard coal to Saxony and the Province of Brandenburg. The railway was included in Polish territory in 1945 according to the post-war Potsdam Agreement.

References

External links
 Andrzej Szynkiewicz: Elektryczna Śląska Kolej Górska, Turysta Dolnośląski 5/2003 i 6/2003

Railway lines in Poland
Lower Silesian Voivodeship
1862 establishments in Prussia